3410 or variant, may refer to:

In general
 A.D. 3410, a year in the 4th millennium CE
 3410 BC, a year in the 4th millennium BCE
 3410, a number in the 3000 (number) range

Other uses
 3410 Vereshchagin, an asteroid in the Asteroid Belt, the 3410th asteroid registered
 Nokia 3410, a cellphone
 Hawaii Route 3410, a state highway
 Texas Farm to Market Road 3410, a state highway

See also